Mimeuseboides excavatipennis is a species of beetle in the family Cerambycidae, and the only species in the genus Mimeuseboides. It was described by Breuning in 1967.

References

Desmiphorini
Beetles described in 1967
Monotypic beetle genera